The Good Life is a 1999 album by Danish rock group Kashmir, which served to greatly increase the popularity of the band. They changed their musical style from the genre of groovecore as seen in their earlier albums Travelogue and Cruzential, into more soft rock. The group was rewarded with 6 Danish grammys for the album.

Track listing

Charts

Certifications

1999 albums
Kashmir (band) albums
Albums produced by Joshua (record producer)